Hanumanasana or  Monkey Pose is a seated asana in modern yoga as exercise. It is the yoga version of the front splits.

Etymology and origins

The name comes from the Sanskrit words Hanuman (a divine entity in Hinduism who resembles a monkey) and asana (posture). The pose commemorates the giant leap made by Hanuman to reach Lanka from the mainland of India.

The pose is not described in the medieval hatha yoga texts. It appears in the 20th century in diverse traditions of modern yoga, such as in Swami Yogesvarananda's 1970 First Steps to Higher Yoga (as Vikatasana), in the Ashtanga Vinyasa Yoga of Pattabhi Jois, in Swami Satyananda Saraswati's 2003 Asana Pranayama Mudra Bandha, and in B. K. S. Iyengar's 1966 Light on Yoga.

Description

Hanumanasana is an advanced pose (rated 36 out of 64 by B. K. S. Iyengar). The pose is approached from a kneeling position, stretching one leg forward and the other straight back while supporting the body with the hands until the full pose is mastered. The hands may then be placed in prayer position (Anjali Mudra). Finally, the arms may be stretched above the head, and the palms joined together. Iyengar states that to reach the full pose, one must make "several attempts each day" and be prepared to work at it for "a long time".

See also 
 Samakonasana, the yoga form of side splits

References

External links 
 Step by Step instruction

Sitting asanas
Asymmetric asanas